Flamingo Air is a small airline in the Bahamas. Its base of operations is the Grand Bahama International Airport in Freeport. It also has offices in Marsh Harbour Abaco Airport, in Bimini International Airport, and in the Lynden Pindling International Airport, Nassau.   It provides scheduled service to several islands, as well as Air Charter service to the Bahamas and south Florida.

Another airline that was based in the Bahamas with a similar name was Flamingo Airlines which operated scheduled passenger service during the early 1970s with British Aircraft Corporation BAC One-Eleven jet aircraft and Convair 340 and Douglas DC-3 prop aircraft from its base in Nassau.

Accidents
The operation has had several minor incidents or accidents none of which has resulted in injury to date:
31 July  2012 - Piper Aztec experienced mechanical problem departing Freeport
18 August 2012 - Cessna 402C hit trees while attempting to abort a landing in heavy rain
4 October 2013 - Cessna 402 landing gear collapsed during landing at Mayaguana on a charter flight
16 August 2016 - Beech 99 A Flamingo Air plane crash landed at the airport in South Bimini on Monday afternoon after the wheel under the right wing collapsed.
3 June 2016 - Beech 99 landing gear failed during landing at Staniel Cay
12 June 2020 - Beech 99 Nose Landing Gear collapsed during landing at Lynden Pindling International Airport

Fleet

Schedules

Freeport to Marsh Harbour
Freeport to South Bimini
Nassau to Staniel Cay
Nassau to Black Point
Nassau to  Great Harbour Cay
Nassau to Mangrove Cay

References

External links
Flamingo Air

Airlines of the Bahamas